"The Gift" is episode 97 of the American television anthology series The Twilight Zone.

Opening narration

Plot
A humanoid alien has just crash-landed outside a mountain village in Mexico, just across the border from Texas. He has killed a police officer and was wounded by another. When he reaches a village bar, he collapses. A sympathetic doctor operates on him, removing two bullets from his chest. The alien (who refers to himself as "Mr. Williams") becomes friends with Pedro, an orphan whose job is to clean the bar. Pedro receives a gift from Williams, who tells Pedro that he will explain it later.

Meanwhile, the bartender notifies the army about Williams' location. Williams attempts to escape back to his ship, but soldiers and villagers corner him. He tries to explain that he has come in peace and that the police officer getting shot was an accident. He tells Pedro to show the gift to the doctor, but the villagers take the gift from him and set it on fire, claiming that it must be black magic or of the devil. As the villagers watch Pedro and Williams reaching for each other, fear drives them to shoot Williams before they believe he has a chance to harm the boy. With Williams lying dead, the doctor picks up the remains of the gift from the fire. He reads the note on it aloud: "Greetings to the people of Earth: We come as friends and in peace. We bring you this gift. The following chemical formula is...a vaccine against all forms of cancer..." The rest is burned away.

The doctor states, "We have not just killed a man; we have killed a dream."

Closing narration

References
DeVoe, Bill. (2008). Trivia from The Twilight Zone. Albany, GA: Bear Manor Media. 
Grams, Martin. (2008). The Twilight Zone: Unlocking the Door to a Television Classic. Churchville, MD: OTR Publishing. 
 Zicree, Marc Scott. The Twilight Zone Companion, Bantam Books, 1982.

External links

1962 American television episodes
The Twilight Zone (1959 TV series season 3) episodes
Television episodes about alien visitations
Television episodes written by Rod Serling